Louis Bielle-Biarrey (born 16 June 2003) is a French rugby union wing who currently plays for Bordeaux Bègles in the Top 14.

References

External links
France profile at FFR
UBB profile
L'Équipe profile

2003 births
Living people
French rugby union players
Union Bordeaux Bègles players
Rugby union wings
FC Grenoble players
Sportspeople from Isère